Alexander Nikolayevich Zelin (born 6 May 1953) served as Commander-in-Chief of the Russian Air Force from 9 May 2007 until 27 April 2012. Zelin holds the Air Force rank of colonel-general.  Since May 2012 Zelin has been an adviser to the Russian Defence Minister.

Biography

Alexander Zelin was born on 6 May 1953, in Perevalsk, Voroshilovgrad region (now Luhansk Oblast in eastern Ukraine). He graduated from Kharkov Higher Aviation School of Pilots in 1976, Gagarin Air Force Academy in 1988, and General Staff Academy in 1997.

From August 2002 to May 2007 he served as Chief of aviation – Air Force Deputy Commander-in-Chief for aviation.

On May 9, 2007, he became the Commander-in-Chief of the Russian Air Force, replacing Army General Vladimir Mikhaylov.

On April 27, 2012, he was dismissed from his post and military service. No reason was given. He was succeeded by Viktor Bondarev.

Honours and awards

Russian Federation
 Honoured Military Pilot of the Russian Federation
 Order of St. George, 2nd class
 Order of Merit for the Fatherland, 4th class
 Order of Military Merit
 Medal For Strengthening Military Cooperation (Min Def)
 Medal "200 Years of the Ministry of Defence" (Min Def)
 Medal "For Distinguished Military Service" 1st Class

Soviet Union
 Order of the Red Star
 Jubilee Medal "60 Years of the Armed Forces of the USSR"
 Jubilee Medal "70 Years of the Armed Forces of the USSR"
 Medals "For Impeccable Service" 2nd and 3rd classes

References

External links

https://web.archive.org/web/20071204223315/http://www.mil.ru/eng/1862/12068/12088/12221/24062/index.shtml

1953 births
Living people
People from Perevalsk
Commanders-in-chief of the Russian Air Force
Russian Air Force generals
Soviet Air Force officers
Recipients of the Order of St. George of the Second Degree
Recipients of the Order of Military Merit (Russia)
Russian colonel generals
Military Academy of the General Staff of the Armed Forces of Russia alumni